Aptinus is a genus of ground beetle native to Europe and the Near East. It contains the following species:

 Aptinus acutangulus Chaudoir, 1876
 Aptinus alpinus Dejean, 1829
 Aptinus bombarda (Illiger, 1800)
 Aptinus cordicollis Chaudoir, 1843
 Aptinus creticus Pic, 1903
 Aptinus displosor L. Dufour, 1811
 Aptinus hovorkai Hrdlicka, 2005
 Aptinus lugubris Schaum, 1862
 Aptinus merditanus Apfelbeck, 1918
 Aptinus pyranaeus Dejean, 1824

References

External links
Aptinus at Fauna Europaea

Brachininae
Taxa named by Franco Andrea Bonelli